Norway competed at the FIS Alpine World Ski Championships 2021 in Cortina d'Ampezzo, Norway, from 8 to 21 February 2021.

Medalists

See also
 Norway national alpine ski team

References

External links
 Cortina 2021 official site

Nations at the FIS Alpine World Ski Championships 2021
Alpine World Ski Championships
Norway at the FIS Alpine World Ski Championships